Peder Hvitfeldts Stræde is a street in the Old Town of Copenhagen, Denmark. It runs from Rosengården in the north to Krystalgade in the south.

History
 
The street is first mentioned in 1581 as Peder Huidfeldzstrede and is later referred to as Huitfeldtstræde. It takes its name after the nobleman Peter Hvidtfeldt (died 1584) who owned a property at the site. He served as Chancellor of Norway from 1547 to 1565.

 
The Guild Hall of the Timbers' Guild was in the 18th century situated on the west side of the street. To its rear was an off-site section of Church of Our Lady's graveyard. It could be reached from Peder Hvitfeldts Stræde  by way of a narrow passageway known as Willum Fuirens Gang.

The street was completely destroyed in the Copenhagen Fire of 1795.

Notable buildings and residents
The yellow, two-storey building at the corner with Krystalgade is a former school associated with nearby Church of Our Lady. It was built in 1820-21 and is now listed on the Danish registry of protected buildings and places. The two narrow buildings at No. 10 (1811) and No. 12 (1809-1818) and the larger, eight-storey property at No. 13 are also listed.

References

External links

 Peder Hvitfeldts Stræde at indenforvoldene.dk

Streets in Copenhagen